Serlo or Sarlo (French Serlon, Italian Serlone) is a Norman masculine given name, derived from the Old Norse Særli, and may refer to:
Serlo I of Hauteville (fl. 11th century), son of Tancred of Hauteville
Serlo II of Hauteville, son and namesake of Serlo I
Serlo de Burci, Norman who became a landowner in south-west England after the Norman conquest
Serlo (bishop of Sées)

Serlo (abbot of Gloucester) (d. 1104) abbot of Gloucester Abbey
Serlo (abbot of Cirencester) (d. c. 1148) abbot of Cirencester Abbey
Serlo of Wilton, English poet
Serlo (priest), inaugural dean of Exeter

References

See also
List of Lord Mayors of London for the mayor named Serlo